State Route 334 (SR 334, OH 334) is an east–west state highway in the western part of the U.S. state of Ohio.

Route description
The entirety of State Route 334 is positioned in the northern portion of Clark County.  There are no stretches of State Route 334 that are included as a part of the  National Highway System, a network of highways deemed most important for the economy, mobility and defense of the country.

History
State Route 334 was first designated in 1969.  When it was first designated, it was routed between what was then designated as U.S. Route 68 (now State Route 72) and its current eastern terminus at State Route 4.  By 1973, with the completion of the U.S. Route 68 freeway around the western side of Springfield, State Route 334 was extended west a short distance to its present western terminus at the interchange it has with the then-new routing of U.S. Route 68.
HB394 of the 127th General Assembly designated and named State Route 334 within Clark County as the "Lance Cpl. Kevin S. Smith Memorial Highway."

Major intersections

References

334
Transportation in Clark County, Ohio